The Custodian of Records is a person designated to be responsible for compliance with the terms of the United States Code, Title 18, Section 2257 which regulates the document retention requirements for pornographic films. It was introduced with the Child Protection and Obscenity Enforcement Act on November 18, 1988.

Proof that all models, actors, actresses and other persons who appear in any visual depiction of sexually explicit activity were at least 18 years of age at the time of production must be maintained and available upon request, for any film produced after November 1, 1990

References

United States pornography law